Kjøkkelvik Idrettslag is a Norwegian sports club from Loddefjord, Bergen. It has sections for football, handball and gymnastics.

The club was founded on 7 October 1934. It participated in official football matches from 1939, and added the sports gymnastics in 1950 and handball in 1973.

The men's handball team has played in the Premier League.

The men's football team currently resides in the Fifth Division (sixth tier). It last played in the Third Division in 2001.

References

Official site

Football clubs in Norway
Association football clubs established in 1934
Sport in Bergen
Norwegian handball clubs
1934 establishments in Norway
Multi-sport clubs in Norway